Kuching City Football Club or simply known as Kuching City is a professional football club based in Kuching, Sarawak, Malaysia that participates in the Malaysia Super League. It is the third professional football club based in the state of Sarawak.

History
In 2015, with the commencement of the People Football League introduced by the Football Association of Malaysia, the purpose of the league was to transform lower leagues in Malaysia and promote amateur football in all districts and states across Malaysia. Consequently, Kuching F.A. was founded alongside it to represent the district of Kuching in Sarawak.

FAM Cup
In the 2015–16 Liga Bolasepak Rakyat, Kuching won the inaugural edition after beating Padang Besar 3-1 at the Selayang Stadium. With the championship, Kuching got an automatic promotion into the 2017 Piala FAM.

In their first season in FAM League, Kuching achieved 4th place in Group B, qualifying the team for the play-offs. They were knocked out in the quarter-final stage by UKM F.C., which later gained promotion to 2018 Malaysia Premier League as finalist of the play-offs. Kuching's second season in the FAM League saw them in the 4th place in Group A, the same as previous season. Unfortunately, changes in the play-off qualifying saw them miss out on the knock-out stage as only top two teams of each group chosen. Kuching were registered to play in the 2019 Malaysia FAM Cup, but were also invited by FAM to play in the 2019 Malaysia Premier League, as a number of teams pull out from the league.

Crest And Colours

Kuching's Crest has a Yellow shield and on it is the flag of Sarawak where the club originated from, and a Green White stripped Tiger on it. "City of Unity" is written in the middle of the crest.

After announcing their promotion to the Malaysia Premier League. Kuching changed their kit to a new one to kick start their new journey, the colours are green with white stripes and "City of Unity" is written in the middle of the kit.

Kuching City reach promotion to Super League for the first time in history after MFL License have been approved from 2023 season.

Kit manufacturers and shirt sponsors

Players

First-team squad

Development squads

Under-21s

Season by season record
Updated on 1 November 2022.

Foreign players (Since 2019 Era)

Club staff
''

Honours

League
Malaysia M3 League
 Promotion Play-offs Winners: 2019

Liga Bolasepak Rakyat
 Winners: 2015–16

References

External links
Official Facebook Page
Sarawak Football News website

 
2015 establishments in Malaysia
Association football clubs established in 2015
Liga Bolasepak Rakyat clubs
Malaysia M3 League
Malaysia Premier League clubs